Sir Wilfrid Wentworth Woods   (11 November 1876 – 7 January 1947) was a British colonial financial administrator.

His roles included serving as the 25th Colonial Auditor of Sri Lanka (then known as Ceylon) from 27 May 1914 until 1 March 1922, Financial Secretary of Ceylon and as a member of the Newfoundland Commission of Government from 1937 to 1944.

He was the father of Admiral Sir Wilfrid John Wentworth Woods (1906– 1975).

Honours
1926 New Year Honours: Commander of the Order of St Michael and St George
1930 New Year Honours: Knight Bachelor
1935 New Year Honours: Knight Commander of the Order of St Michael and St George
1943 Birthday Honours: Knight Commander of the Order of the British Empire

References

1876 births
1947 deaths
People educated at St John's School, Leatherhead
Knights Bachelor
Knights Commander of the Order of St Michael and St George
Knights Commander of the Order of the British Empire
British colonial governors and administrators in Asia
British colonial governors and administrators in the Americas
Auditors General of Sri Lanka
People from Wiltshire
Alumni of the University of Oxford
Members of the Legislative Council of Ceylon
British people in British Ceylon